The Pennsylvania Interscholastic Marching Band Association (PIMBA) is a nonprofit organization that serves as a competitive adjudication circuit for high school marching bands in western Pennsylvania. Founded in 1996 from the PFCJ marching band circuit, the organization now includes 20 member bands who perform at both local festivals as well as the PIMBA Championships.  Member bands host the adjudications throughout the fall season.

Background
PIMBA events provide both healthy competition and constructive feedback for performing bands.  Directors pay membership dues in order for their ensemble to be classified as a member of the circuit.  Classifications are broken down by the number of performing instrumentalists per ensemble.  The current classifications are as follows:

 Class A: 1–40 instrumentalists
 Class AA: 41– 60 instrumentalists
 Class AAA: 61–85 instrumentalists
 Class AAAA: 86+ instrumentalists

Directors may also choose to have their ensemble perform in judged exhibition or Festival Class.  These bands will not be placed but will still receive judges' commentary and an individual score.  From 1997 to 2012, PIMBA also featured a National Class– qualifications for this class included placing in the top five at BOA Regional competitions for two consecutive years or by special request of the director.

The final competition to take place for each season is the PIMBA Championships.  At the championships, bands receive final scoring in their respective classes with the top scoring band from each class being crowned a PIMBA Class Champion.  The championships has historically been held at the following locations:

 Elizabeth Forward High School– 3 times (2003, 2005, 2007) 
 Gateway High School– 7 times (2008, 2009, 2013, 2015, 2017, 2019, 2021)
 Moon Area High School– 2 times (2016, 2018)
 North Allegheny Senior High School– 1 time (1996) 
 Norwin High School– 4 times (2000, 2002, 2006, and 2011)
 Penn-Trafford High School– 6 times (1999, 2001, 2004, 2010, 2012, and 2014)
 South Park High School– 1 time (1998)

Scoring is based upon the same system used by Bands of America, featuring a Musical Performance category (worth 20 points), a Visual Performance category (worth 20 points), and a General Effect category (worth 60 points).  Unlike BOA, the raw total from these three categories is divided by two and raised by 50 to establish an ensemble's final score.

PIMBA Championship Results: 1996-2022
Throughout PIMBA's history, there have been 26 Championship competitions.  Several historical caveats should be noted:

 1996: AAAA was referred to as Open Class
 1997-2012: National Class was introduced and lasted for 15 seasons
 1999: No Class AAA, AAAA, or National Class Champions (Field Washout)
 2019: No Class AAA or AAAA Champions (Weather Cancellation)
2020: No PIMBA Festivals or Championships (COVID-19)

Below is a historical catalogue of each class champion band, including their respective scores and show titles if known.  Next to the name of the champion in parentheses is the # of times that band has been crowned a class champion.  Additional Note: the current scoring system for PIMBA was introduced in the 2004 season with revisions also being made for the 2013 and 2018 seasons, respectively.

References

High school marching bands from the United States
Music organizations based in the United States
Educational organizations based in the United States
Organizations established in 1996